William Edward Openshaw (5 February 1852 – 7 February 1915) was a rugby union international who represented England from 1879 to 1879.

Life
The son of W. Openshaw of Victoria Park, Manchester, he was educated at Harrow School. There he played in the Cricket XI in 1869, leaving in 1870. He became a merchant in Manchester.

Rugby union career
Openshaw played his club rugby for Manchester (then known as Manchester Football Club). Openshaw made his international debut on 24 March 1879 at The Oval in the England vs Ireland match in which he was on the winning side. He was described by contemporaries as a wonderful dribbler and took part in the second ever "Roses" match between Lancashire and Yorkshire.

Cricketing career
Openshaw played four first-class cricket matches for Lancashire from 1879 to 1882.

References

1852 births
1915 deaths
19th-century English businesspeople
England international rugby union players
English cricketers
English rugby union players
Lancashire County RFU players
Lancashire cricketers
People educated at Harrow School
Rugby union halfbacks
Rugby union players from Cape Town